El Tarahal or El Molino del Tarahal is a village located in the municipality of Cuevas del Almanzora, in Almería province, Andalusia, Spain. As of 2020, it has a population of 14.

Geography 
El Tarahal is located 88km northeast of Almería.

References

Populated places in the Province of Almería